PLUNA (PLUNA Líneas Aéreas Uruguayas S.A.) was an Uruguayan airline company which ceased operations in . Following is a list of destinations that were served by PLUNA as part of its scheduled services.

List

References

Lists of airline destinations